Edmar Monteiro dos Santos Victoriano a.k.a. "Baduna", (born 10 November 1975 in Luanda) is a former Angolan professional basketball player with Petro Atlético and Primeiro de Agosto. A former player of the Angolan national basketball team, he competed for Angola at the 1996, 2000 and 2004 Summer Olympics as well as the 2002 World Championships.

His career was cut short in 2006 due to injury.

Facts
 Victoriano was born the day before Angola's official independence on 11 November 1975.
 Edmar's older brother, Ângelo Victoriano and younger brother Puna Victoriano have also been remarkable Angolan basketball players.

External links
 
 Edmar Victoriano Yahoo! Sports

1975 births
Living people
Basketball players from Luanda
Angolan men's basketball players
Atlético Petróleos de Luanda basketball players
Basketball players at the 1996 Summer Olympics
Basketball players at the 2000 Summer Olympics
Basketball players at the 2004 Summer Olympics
C.D. Primeiro de Agosto men's basketball players
Olympic basketball players of Angola
Power forwards (basketball)
2002 FIBA World Championship players